Captain Owen Fiennes Temple Roberts FRSE MC (1896–1968) was a British astronomer and meteorologist.

Life
He was born in Mauritius in 1896 the son of Alfred Temple Roberts (1857–1911) and his wife Susan Charlotte Catherine Fiennes-Clinton (d.1936).

In the First World War he served with the Royal Garrison Artillery and rose to the rank of captain, winning the Military Cross.

After the war he completed his studies at Cambridge University graduating MA around 1921. He then began lecturing in Astronomy and Meteorology at Aberdeen University.

In 1928 he was elected a Fellow of the Royal Society of Edinburgh. His proposers were Hector Munro Macdonald, James Goodwillie, Ralph Allan Sampson and Arthur Crichton Mitchell.

He died in Leicester in 1968.

Family

In 1918 he married Ethel S. Fenner in Cheltenham.

Publications

The Theoretical Scattering of Smoke in a Turbulent Atmosphere (1923)
A Note on Measuring the Gradient Wind (1946)

References

1896 births
1968 deaths
Mauritian emigrants to the United Kingdom
British meteorologists
Fellows of the Royal Society of Edinburgh
Recipients of the Military Cross
Alumni of the University of Cambridge
Academics of the University of Aberdeen
British Army personnel of World War I
Royal Garrison Artillery officers